Tiago Maria Antunes Gouveia (born 18 June 2001) is a Portuguese professional footballer who plays as a forward for Primeira Liga club Estoril, on loan from Benfica.

Career statistics

Club

Notes

References

2001 births
Living people
People from Lisbon
Portuguese footballers
Portugal youth international footballers
Association football forwards
Sporting CP footballers
S.L. Benfica footballers
S.L. Benfica B players
G.D. Estoril Praia players
Primeira Liga players
Liga Portugal 2 players